Vlasta Zorko (born May 27, 1934 in Maribor) is a Slovenian sculptor. She studied sculpture at the Academy of Fine Arts and Design, Ljubljana alongside fellow sculptor Zdenko Kalin, graduating in 1959. After graduating she studied abroad and has been a freelance artist since 1972. She was married to sculptor Slavko Tihec from 1958 to 1983. 

Her sculptures are typically of people, made out of stone, concrete, metal and other materials. 

She has exhibited at the Museum of Modern and Contemporary Art Koroška (KGLU).

In 2018 a retrospective of her work was held at the Umetnostna galerija Maribor (Maribor Art Gallery).

References

1934 births
20th-century Slovenian sculptors
21st-century Slovenian sculptors
Living people
Artists from Maribor
University of Ljubljana alumni
Slovenian women artists
20th-century women artists
21st-century women artists